Basol River is a river that flows southward in the Gwadar District of Balochistan Province, in southwestern Pakistan.

The Basol River drains a desert area of the Makran region, with its river mouth at Khor Kalmat lagoon on the Gulf of Oman, of the Arabian Sea.

References

Rivers of Balochistan (Pakistan)
Gulf of Oman
Gwadar District
Rivers of Pakistan